Griffin, in comics, may refer to:

Griffin (Dan Vado), an AWOL space mercenary originally published by DC Comics
Griffin (DC Comics), a DC Comics character who is a novice superhero and roommate to Bart Allen
Griffin (Marvel Comics), a Marvel comics supervillain
Griffin, an alias used by the Clown in Marvel Comics' World War Hulk: Gamma Corps mini-series

See also
Griffin (disambiguation)